Weeks is an unincorporated community in Scott County, in the U.S. state of Arkansas.

History
Weeks was founded in the 1880s, and named after the local Weeks family.  A variant name was "Week". A post office was established at Weeks in 1902, and remained in operation until 1922.

References

Unincorporated communities in Arkansas
Unincorporated communities in Scott County, Arkansas